Rūta Gajauskaitė (born 22 January 1989 in Kaunas, Lithuania) is a Lithuanian figure skater. She is the 2006 Lithuanian national champion. She is coached by Povilas Vanagas's mother.

Competitive highlights

 J = Junior level; QR = Qualifying Round

References

External links

 

Lithuanian female single skaters
1989 births
Living people